The Shanghai Futures Building is a 37 floor tower in the Pudong area of Shanghai that was completed in 1998. It was designed by architect Langdon Wilson.

References
 Shanghai Futures Building

Specific

Skyscraper office buildings in Shanghai